Michelle Brogan (born 8 February 1973) is a former basketball player from Australia, who won the bronze medal with the Australia women's national basketball team at the 1996 Summer Olympics in Atlanta, Georgia. Four years later she was on the side that claimed the silver medal in Sydney, Australia, when she was known as Michelle Griffiths. She attended the Australian Institute of Sport in 1988–1990.

Michelle Brogan is the older sister of former National Basketball league player and AFL player Dean Brogan.

Her son Bailey Griffiths plays for South Adelaide in the SANFL

See also
 List of Australian WNBA players
 WNBL Rookie of the Year Award

References

 WNBL

1973 births
Living people
Australian expatriate basketball people in the United States
Australian Institute of Sport basketball (WNBL) players
Australian women's basketball players
Basketball players at the 1996 Summer Olympics
Basketball players at the 2000 Summer Olympics
Olympic basketball players of Australia
Olympic bronze medalists for Australia
Olympic medalists in basketball
Olympic silver medalists for Australia
Phoenix Mercury players
Basketball players from Adelaide
Sportswomen from South Australia
Medalists at the 2000 Summer Olympics
Medalists at the 1996 Summer Olympics